Mohamed Ali Anwar Reda (born April 16, 1989 in Cairo), known as Mohamed Reda, is a professional squash player who represented Egypt. He reached a career-high world ranking of World No. 23 in October 2011.

References

External links 
 
 

1989 births
Living people
Egyptian male squash players
21st-century Egyptian people